treats! (often referred to as Treats, Treats!, Treats Magazine or Treats! Magazine) is an American limited-edition erotica and fine arts magazine that is primarily available by subscription. The magazine, which debuted in 2011, is described as a quarterly although it was initially only published twice a year.

Content
treats! describes itself as "a limited edition, fine art print & digital publication available only by subscription & sold at news-stands, book stores & worldwide." The literary content of the magazine has been described as "left-of-center" by Daily Beast. The magazine, which is based in Los Angeles, is described by USA Today, The Huffington Post, and The New York Times as an artistic erotica magazine. Adam Tschorn of the Los Angeles Times noted that his "copilot" felt that the magazine's nude photography was "virtually indistinguishable" from Playboy despite the "fine arts quarterly" billing.

Publication history
Steve Shaw, the magazine's publisher, has a background in celebrity glamour photography for Maxim, FHM, Playboy, and British Esquire. He states that he had become irritated with shooting restrictions such as "three quarters of one side of a boob... You can only show one inch down from the bum crack..." and with uncooperative subjects. Thus, he says, he created his own magazine with what Daily Beast described as "female full-frontal nudity, luxe-y aesthetic, and [an] underpinning of fashion-world credibility" that has gotten "influential tastemakers and industry icons" to take notice. According to Shaw, treats! was founded to present content that was too risqué for magazines such as Vogue, Elle and InStyle. Shaw's nickname for photos that could not be used because they pushed the borders too far was "treats", and he decided to use the nickname as the title for the magazine. The magazine presents images that have not been airbrushed or photographically retouched.

Shaw's initial investment for his magazine was $600,000. He publishes the magazine independently out of editorial offices on La Brea Avenue in Los Angeles, with a staff of three people. Shaw served as editor-in-chief and publisher, Eric Roinestad was art director, Rebecca Black was director of photography, and the editor was Rob Hill was, who had previously been editor of Hollywood Life magazine. Shaw and the magazine throw an annual Halloween "Trick or Treats" party.

The launch party for the magazine was held on February 24, 2011 at the James Goldstein residence as an Oscars-week party before the 83rd Academy Awards. Issue 1 of the magazine, which had no advertisements, debuted with a cover photo of models Irene Lambers and Cassy Gerasimova photographed by Tony Duran that was described by Business Wire as "edgy, scintillating and elegant". Articles in the premier include features on Jason Statham and Shepard Fairey. Five thousand copies were printed of the debut issue, and 10,000 for issue 2. Its launch was recognised with a "best new launch" award of 2011 by the Media Industry Newsletter (MIN).

The magazine debuted prices of $20 at the newsstand price, $65 for an annual subscription price and $15 for a download. With the fourth issue the newsstand price changed to $30. In 2012, the magazine added an online gallery that sold prints of the magazine's content at prices ranging from $395 to $3,995—depending on size and framing.

Emily Ratajkowski posed for several of the early issues. She states that her appearance on the March 2012 issue 3 cover is what brought her two unsolicited high-profile music video modeling roles (Robin Thicke, T.I., and Pharrell Williams' "Blurred Lines" and Maroon 5's "Love Somebody"). Thicke had seen the treats! magazine black-and-white cover and convinced director Diane Martel to cast her in the "Blurred Lines" music video.

Within the first year of its launch photographers, including Brett Ratner, were volunteering to shoot for the magazine. As of 2014, Duran, Mark Seliger, Ben Watts, Josh Ryan and Bob Carlos Clarke are among the photographers who have been featured in the magazine.

The cover of the seventh, 2014 Spring/Summer, issue of treats!, which was published in April 2014, featured Dylan Penn, daughter of Sean Penn and Robin Wright, nude, albeit with a Fendi bag strategically placed in front of her groin, with similar placements used in her interior pictorial. Penn was photographed by Duran. According to an E! Online report on March 5, 2014, Penn had declined a $150,000 offer to pose for the cover of Playboy.

The eighth issue (featuring Lydia Hearst on the cover) was released in February 2015.

Legal issues
In 2018, the owner and publisher, Steve Shaw, was sued in the Delaware Court of Chancery by Tyler and Cameron Winklevoss, who alleged Shaw mismanaged $1.3 million that they had invested in the magazine.  By turn, Shaw alleges the Winklevoss twins used the magazine to "advance their sleazy agenda," and that no funds were mismanaged. Shaw further alleged that the Winklevoss' "promise to publicly announce their investment in Treats! and use their brand to grow the company induced Shaw and Treats! to perform personal and professional favors for them."  This counterclaim was dismissed. This decision was the subject of an article on the defense of laches in The National Law Review on March 27, 2019.

Format
The print editions are produced in oversized format on 70 lb. matte stock. The magazine is also available digitally in several formats such as on Zinio for iPad and as a mobile phone app as well as via the official website, a blog, and various social media websites.

References

External links

2011 establishments in the United States
Visual arts magazines published in the United States
Erotica magazines published in the United States
Quarterly magazines published in the United States
Biannual magazines published in the United States
English-language magazines
Fashion magazines published in the United States
Magazines established in 2011
Magazines published in Los Angeles
Photography magazines